The 1966 Tangerine Bowl was an NCAA College Division game following the 1966 season, between the West Chester Golden Rams and the Morgan State Bears. Morgan State linebacker Willie Lanier was named the game's most valuable player.

Background
The game was one of four regional finals in the College Division, the predecessor of Division II; the other three postseason games were the Pecan, Grantland Rice, and Camellia bowls, also played on December 10.

Notable participants
Morgan State players who subsequently had NFL careers include Lanier, defensive back Bob Wade, quarterback and kicker (later, defensive back) Daryl Johnson, wide receiver Alvin Mitchell, and linebacker (later, running back) Jeff Queen. Wade also went on to be head basketball coach for the Maryland Terrapins. James Phillips played in the NFL and went on to become head football and wrestling coach at Morgan State.  Lanier and head coach Earl Banks are inductees of the College Football Hall of Fame. Lanier is an inductee of the Pro Football Hall of Fame.

West Chester quarterback Jim Haynie, offensive end Don Wilkinson, and head coach Bob Mitten are inductees of their university's hall of fame.

Scoring summary

References

Further reading
 
 

Tangerine Bowl
Citrus Bowl (game)
Morgan State Bears football bowl games
West Chester Golden Rams football bowl games
Tangerine Bowl
Tangerine Bowl